Pan Pingge (1610–1677), was a notable Chinese philosopher during the late-Ming and early-Qing period.

Biography
Pan was born in Cixi City, Ningbo, Zhejiang Province in late Ming Dynasty in 1610. His courtesy name was Yongwei (用微).

During the Shunzhi Era, Pan lived in Shanying (Traditional/Simplified Chinese: 山陰/山阴; current Shaoxing), Zhejiang Province for ten years. Later Pan became a lecturer in Kunshan (昆山; current Suzhou), Jiangsu Province.

Philosophy
Pan chronologically studied and inspected the philosophies of Cheng-Zhu, Lu-Wang, and Buddhist philosophy (especially the Zen buddhism). Pan discovered some subtle conflicts between these philosophical schools, and thought the Neo-confucianism developed in Song, Yuan and Ming dynasties were quite derivatives from the original thoughts or principles of Confucius and Mencius.

Pan criticized that Neo-confucianism mixed too much Zen buddhism, thus called those confucian scholars the "Monks of the Confucian Temple".

Pan considered that Cheng-Zhu School philosophically debated with Lu-Wang School is a kind of using Taoism to attack Buddhism (以老攻佛), and vice versa (以佛攻老).

Pan's philosophy was searching for the humanity (求仁), and he emphasized to search truth or true knowledge from daily living and practice. Pan proposed the theories of one integrated mass (渾然一體/浑然一体) and the sight from the true mind (見在真心/见在真心).

Works
Books:
 Searching for Humanity (《求仁录》)
 Summary of Pan's Searching for Humanity (《潘子求仁录辑要》), 10 volumes, by his students
 Innovations of the Four Classics (《四书发明》) (The four classics stand for the Four Books of Confucianism, namely the Great Learning, the Doctrine of the Mean, the Analects of Confucius, and the Mencius)
 The Critique of Two Schools (《辨二氏之学》) (Two schools are two main Neo-confucian schools, the Cheng-Zhu School and the Lu-Wang School)

Main references
 Biography of Pan Pingge, from Ningbo civic archive of Qing Dynasty
 Brief Biography of Pan Pingge, from Huaxia.com

Papers:
 Religious Dimension of the Xiaojing Discourse in the Late Ming, by Miaw-fen Lu
 On Pan Pingge's Practical Ideology, by Pan Qizao

1610 births
1677 deaths
Ming dynasty philosophers
Writers from Ningbo
Qing dynasty philosophers
Ming dynasty essayists
Qing dynasty essayists
Philosophers from Zhejiang
17th-century Chinese philosophers